Chris Johnstone (born 12 October 1960) is a former professional tennis player from Australia.

Career
Johnstone was runner-up to Pat Serret at the 1978 Australian Junior Championships.

His best Grand Slam performance came at the 1982 Wimbledon Championships, where he had wins over David Schneider and Jay Lapidus, to make the third round. In the mixed doubles he and partner Pam Whytcross were semi-finalists.

A right-hander, Johnstone made the finals in both the singles and doubles draws at the 1982 South Australian Open. He lost the singles final to Mike Bauer but won the doubles, with Pat Cash.

Grand Prix career finals

Singles: 1 (0–1)

Doubles: 1 (1–0)

Challenger titles

Singles: (2)

Doubles: (4)

References

External links 
 
 
 

1960 births
Living people
Australian male tennis players
Tennis players from Perth, Western Australia